Sisters of Pearl (Traditional Chinese: (掌上明珠) is a 2010 TVB pre-modern drama series, starring Jessica Hsuan, Michael Tao, and Bowie Lam.

Synopsis
After the death of her husband, Chu Pik-Ha (Jessica Hsuan) returns to her maiden home with her son, in a deliberate attempt to take over the family jewelry business from her elder sister Chu Pik-Wan (Kiki Sheung). To prevent Ha from getting too out of hand, Wan needs her husband Ho Cheung-Hing (Bowie Lam) to create trouble for her sibling. Hing does not follow her instructions, but instead secretly helps Ha tackle her problems one by one. Wan soon comes to realize that Hing has never really got over Ha. Wan's younger sister Chu Pik-Lam (Macy Chan) is still attending school and is too young to deal with such family issues. Wan feels a profound sense of helplessness and becomes even more frustrated when So Lai-Sheung (Joyce Tang) turns up suddenly claiming to be a mistress of her late father and pregnant with his baby. Out of respect for their father, the sisters agree to put Sheung up for the time being until the situation becomes clearer. Shortly thereafter, Ha discovers that Sheung is just a tool of Sang (Michael Tao) who has been plotting to wage a battle of will against the Chu's. Meanwhile, Cheung-Hing has been secretly plotting his revenge against the Chu family all along for framing his father for a crime Wan committed leading to him being jailed in her place, and later committing suicide.

Cast

Awards and nominations
TVB Anniversary Awards (2010)
 Nominated: Best Drama
 Nominated: Best Supporting Actor (Joel Chan)
 Nominated: Best Supporting Actress (Kiki Sheung)
 Nominated: Most Improved Actor (Joel Chan)

Asian Television Awards (2010)
 Best Drama Performance by an Actor in a Leading Role (Bowie Lam)

Viewership ratings

References

External links
TVB.com Sisters of Pearl - Official Website 
K for TVB Sisters of Pearl - Series Synopsis 

TVB dramas
2010 Hong Kong television series debuts
2010 Hong Kong television series endings